Sureni Senarath (17 June 1959 – 26 May 2021) was an actress in Sri Lankan cinema, theatre and television.

Family background
She was born on 17 June 1959 in Colombo, Sri Lanka as the eldest of the family. She completed education from Kalutara Balika National School and Rosmead Balika Vidyalaya, Colombo 8. She was unmarried in her life.

Her father Piyaratne Senarath was a film actor. Her mother Iranganie was a film producer. Sureni had one sister: Gayani and two brothers: Harsha, Prabhath, all are involved in film coordination. Piyaratne was born in 1925 and later worked in the Department of Immigration and Emigration. As an actor, Piyaratne starred in the films Vædibima, Ruhuṇu Kumāri, Dehadaka Duka, Pickpockeṭ, Kēsara Sinhayō, Ada Mehemayi and Siril Mallī. He died in 2001. Piyaratne's younger brother Navaratne Senarath was a member of the Sarasaviya Awards Jury when he was the Director General of Sri Lanka Customs.

Career 
Sureni made her film acting debut in the 1975 film Amaraneeya Adare produced by her mother and directed by Dayananda Jayawardena. She was the producer of the 1986 film Mal Warusa where she also played a supportive role in it. She acted in more than 25 films in her career limited career. The turning point in her film career was her self-produced 1983 film Loku Thaththa directed by K. D. Dayananda. Sureni played the role of a circus performer in this film and later won the Lux Award for Best Upcoming Actress at the 1984 Sarasaviya Awards.

Some of her other notable performances as an actress came in Chandi Raja (1990), Dalulana Gini (1995), Salupata Ahasata 2 (2000), Yalu Malu Yalu 2 (2018). As a teledrama actress, she acted in the television serials: Kaḷu Kapā Eḷi, Bhumarangaya and Kindurangana. As a theatre actress, she also starred in the plays Valākuḷu, Yakaḍa Sapattu and Naralovaṭa Væḍa. During this time, she was in charge of the Kataragama Resort.

Apart from acting, she served as the Working Director of the Sri Lanka National Film Corporation. For a time she was a member of the United National Party and was also an active member of the Arts Organization.

Death 
She died on 26 May 2021 at the age of 61 at the Apeksha Hospital in Maharagama after suffering from severe cancer. Her remains were laid to rest at the Jayaratne Funeral Home, Borella. The final rites took place at the General Cemetery in Borella at 5.00 pm on 27 May 2021.

Filmography

See also 

 List of Sri Lankan actors

References

External links 

 

1959 births
2021 deaths
Sinhalese actresses
Sri Lankan film actresses
Sri Lankan stage actresses
Sri Lankan television actresses
Deaths from cancer in Sri Lanka
20th-century Sri Lankan actresses
21st-century Sri Lankan actresses